The Rhine is a river in Europe.

Rhine may also refer to:

People
Joseph Banks Rhine (1895–1980), a parapsychologist

Places

United States
Rhine, Georgia, a town 
Rhine, Wisconsin, a town 
Rhine Center, Wisconsin, an unincorporated community
Rhine Creek (West Virginia), a stream in West Virginia

Australia
Somme Creek (South Australia), formerly North Rhine, an Australian place names changed from German
Marne River (South Australia), formerly South Rhine
Cambrai, South Australia, formerly Rhine Villa

Other
Confederation of the Rhine, a country from 1806–13
The Rhine, an 1842 travelogue by Victor Hugo
Rhine, a merchant ship
Local spelling of rhyne, a drainage ditch or canal used to turn areas of wetland at around sea level into useful pasture
Rhine or Rijn, the name given to one of the plane destroyed in the 1977 Tenerife Airport Disaster

See also
Rhine provinces
Rhene, a spider genus
Rhene (mythology)
Rhines (disambiguation)